Esenpınar is a town in Mersin Province, Turkey.

Geography 

Esenpınar is in the rural area of Erdemli district of Mersin Province. The population was 1664 as of 2012.

History 

The former name of the settlement was Gövere. Gövere was founded by a Turkmen tribe named Sarıkeçili. Although exact date of foundation is uncertain, it is claimed that the settlement might have been founded during the era of Seljuks, (i.e., 12-13th century). The mosque of Gövere was built in 1741 and there is a grave stone which dates back to 1461. The settlement was declared a township in 1992.

Economy 
The main economic activity is irrigated farming, the source of irrigation being Limonlu River and Gövere puddle at the north of the town. Cauliflower, bean, tomato, apple and peach are among the more important crops.

References 

Populated places in Mersin Province
Towns in Turkey
Populated places in Erdemli District